ASFAT Inc., (acronym: Askeri Fabrika ve Tersane İşletme, Military Factory and Shipyard Management) is a Turkish state-owned defense contractor. The company under the jurisdiction of the Turkish Ministry of National Defense, which develop, manage and utilise the facilities and capabilities of the 27 ordnance factories and 3 public naval shipyards in Turkey that were previously led by the country’s Ministry of National Defense, to provide design, manufacture, maintenance, sustainment and training for global defence market.

History 
In 2019 ASFAT partnered with Vard Marine of Canada to produce naval and coast guard vessels for the international market. Also at International Defence Industry Fair 2019 ASFAT signed an MOU with Damen Group.

References

Military industry
Government-owned companies of Turkey
Defence companies of Turkey
Turkish companies established in 2018
Manufacturing companies based in Ankara
Ministry of National Defense (Turkey)
2018 establishments in Turkey